Carlos Lourenço (26 March 1923 – 2008) was a Portuguese sailor. He competed at the 1948 Summer Olympics, the 1952 Summer Olympics and the 1956 Summer Olympics.

References

External links
 

1923 births
2008 deaths
Portuguese male sailors (sport)
Olympic sailors of Portugal
Sailors at the 1948 Summer Olympics – Dragon
Sailors at the 1952 Summer Olympics – Dragon
Sailors at the 1956 Summer Olympics – Dragon
Place of birth missing